Wuntho is a town in Katha District, Sagaing Division, Myanmar.  It is the administrative seat of Wuntho Township.

History

While not the capital, it gave its name to the native state of Wuntho which was formally annexed to Burma by the British in 1892. Rail service from Mandalay was extended to Wuntho in 1893.

On 30 December 1994, on the outskirts of Wuntho on the Bonkyaung bridge a Mandalay-Myitkyina passenger train derailed when its brakes failed and one passenger car plummeted into a ravine.  In all, 102 people were killed and 53 were seriously injured.

Notes

External links
 "Photograph of a street in Wuntho, 1891" Royal Commonwealth Society Library
 "Wuntho Map — Satellite Images of Wuntho" Maplandia

Township capitals of Myanmar
Populated places in Sagaing Region